Mount Jerome Cemetery & Crematorium is situated in Harold's Cross on the south side of Dublin, Ireland. Since its foundation in 1836, it has witnessed over 300,000 burials. Originally an exclusively Protestant cemetery, Roman Catholics have also been buried there since the 1920s.

History
The name of the cemetery comes from an estate established there by the Reverend Stephen Jerome, who in 1639 was vicar of St. Kevin's Parish. At that time, Harold's Cross was part of St. Kevin's Parish. In the latter half of the 17th century, the land passed into the ownership of the Earl of Meath, who in turn leased plots to prominent Dublin families. A house, Mount Jerome House, was constructed in one of these plots, and leased to John Keogh. In 1834, after an aborted attempt to set up a cemetery in the Phoenix Park, the General Cemetery Company of Dublin bought the Mount Jerome property, "for establishing a general cemetery in the neighbourhood of the city of Dublin".

The Funerary Chapel in the cemetery was the first Puginian Gothic church in Dublin. It was designed by William Atkins.

The first official burial happened on the 19th of September 1836. The buried deceased were the infant twins of Matthew Pollock.

The cemetery initially started with a landmass of 26 acres and grew to a size of 48 acres in 1874.

In 1984, burial numbers were falling, thus the Cemetery was losing revenue and began to deteriorate. A crematorium was needed to regain revenue and deal with plant overgrowth on the estate. In 2000, Mount Jerome Cemetery established its own crematorium on the site.

Notable burials

Notable people buried here include:

Robert Adams (1791–1875), physician and professor of surgery
Maeve Binchy (1940–2012), author (cremated)
Fritz Brase (1875–1940), German military musician and composer
Edward Bunting (1773–1843), musician, music-collector
Frederick William Burton (1816–1900), painter and director of the National Gallery
Peter Caffrey (1949–2008), actor (cremated) 
Sir Charles Cameron (1830–1921), headed, for 50 years, the Public Health Department of Dublin Corporation (and two of his sons)
James Campbell, 1st Baron Glenavy (1851–1931), lawyer, politician and Lord Chancellor of Ireland
William Carleton (1794–1869), writer
Thomas Caulfield Irwin (1823–1892), poet, writer, scholar
Abraham Colles (1773–1843), surgeon, professor of medicine
John Augustus Conolly VC (1829–1888), soldier
Michael Colivet (1882–1955), Irish politician, Commandant of the Irish Volunteers for Limerick City, a founding member of the Irish Republic and, in later years, Chairman of the National Housing Board.
Paddy Daly (1888–1957), member of the IRA during the War of Independence and later Major-General in the Irish Army
Achilles Daunt (1832–1878), preacher and homilist
Derek Davis (1948–2015), broadcaster
Thomas Davis, (1814–1845), journalist, politician, founder of The Nation newspaper
Thomas Drummond (1797–1840), surveyor, Under-Secretary for Ireland
Professor George Francis FitzGerald (1851-1901), physicist
Ethel Kathleen French ( Moore, 1871–1891), artist and illustrator, first wife of Percy French 
Edward Gibson, 1st Baron Ashbourne (1837–1913), lawyer and Lord Chancellor of Ireland
Robert Graves (1796–1853), professor of medicine and writer
Robert Perceval Graves (1810–1893), biographer of William R. Hamilton
Sir Richard John Griffith (1784–1878), geologist, mining engineer, chairman of the Board of Works, author of Griffith's Valuation
Thomas Grubb (1800–1878), optician, telescope-maker
Benjamin Guinness (1798–1868), brewer, philanthropist, and other members of the Guinness family
George Halpin (1779–1854), civil engineer and lighthouse builder
William Rowan Hamilton (1805–1865), mathematician and astronomer
James Haughton (1795–1873), social reformer
John Kells Ingram (1823–1907), politician, scholar, mathematician and poet ("The Memory of the Dead")
John Hewitt Jellett (1817–1888), mathematician and Provost of Trinity College
John Edward Jones (1806–1862), civil engineer and sculptor
David Kelly (1929–2012), actor (cremated)
Joseph Robinson Kirk (1821–1894), sculptor, who also executed the figure over the memorial of his father, Thomas
Thomas Kirk (1781–1845), sculptor, who also designed the Butler mausoleum in this cemetery
John Mitchell Kemble (1807–1857), scholar
Joseph Sheridan Le Fanu (1814–1873), writer and editor (along with his wife, Susanna Bennett, her father and two brothers, in the same vault)
Thomas Hawkesworth Ledwich (1823–1858), surgeon and anatomist
Thomas Langlois Lefroy (1776–1869), politician and judge
Percy Ludgate (1883–1922), accountant mathematician and inventor; designer of the second analytical engine
Jan Lukasiewicz (1878–1956), Polish philosopher, logician and mathematician
David Marcus (1924–2009), Irish Jewish writer/editor
Sir Henry Marsh (1770–1860), physician
William Ramsay McNab (1844-1889), Scottish physician and botanist
William Fetherstone Montgomery (1797–1859), obstetrician
Hans Garrett Moore VC (1830–1889), soldier
Arthur Thomas Moore VC (1830–1912), soldier

Sir Richard Morrison (1767–1849), architect (Pro-Cathedral, Trinity College)
William Vitruvius Morrison (1794–1838), architect
John Skipton Mulvany (1813–1870), architect who also designed a number of monuments in this cemetery, including the Mahony monument and Perry and West vaults
Máirtín Ó Cadhain (1906–1970), Irish-language writer
 Máirtín Ó Direáin, (1910–1988), Irish-language poet
Walter Osborne (1859–1903), artist
Peter Marshall (died 1890), prominent member of the Masonic and Orange Orders
William McFadden Orr (1866–1934), mathematician
George Papworth (1781–1855), architect
Jacob Owen (1778–1870), architect and engineer to the Board of Works
Edward Arthur Henry Pakenham, 6th Earl of Longford (1902–1961) was an Irish peer, politician, and littérateur
George Petrie (1790–1886), artist archaeologist, musician
William Plunket, 4th Baron Plunket (1828–1897), Archbishop of Dublin
Sarah Purser (1848–1943), artist
George Russell (1867–1935), writer and artist
Cecil Sheridan (1910–1980), comedian and actor
John Skelton (1924–2009), artist and illustrator
Ellen Smyly (1815–1901), founder of the Smyly Homes
Robert William Smith (1807–1873), pathologist
Bindon Blood Stoney (1828–1909), engineer
John Millington Synge (1871–1909), playwright
Isaac Weld (1774–1856), topographical writer, explorer and artist
William Wilde, father of Oscar Wilde. His wife, Jane Francesca Elgee, is commemorated on Sir William's monument, but she was buried in Kensal Green Cemetery in London.
S. Allen Windle (1828–1880), Chaplain of the Mariners' Church, Dún Laoghaire
Edward Perceval Wright (1834–1910), ophthalmic surgeon, botanist and zoologist
Jack Butler Yeats (1871–1957), artist

There is a large plot dedicated to deceased members of the Royal Irish Constabulary and the Dublin Metropolitan Police.

The cemetery contains the war graves of 35 British Commonwealth service personnel from World War I and 39 from World War II.

The remains of French Huguenots from St. Peter's Churchyard, Peter's Row (now the location of the Dublin YMCA), which was demolished in the 1980s, and from St. Brigid's and St. Thomas's churchyards are interred in the cemetery.

Over 200 children of unmarried mothers who died in the Protestant run Bethany Home were buried in unmarked graves in the cemetery. There is a plot where unnamed children from Kirwan House the Protestant run Female Orphan Home are buried.

Recent burials include the notorious Martin Cahill (1949–1994) (known as "The General"). His gravestone has been vandalised on numerous occasions and is currently broken in two with the top half missing. His body has since been removed to an unmarked grave in the cemetery.

Flora
The cemetery has one of only two Christ-thorn bushes in Ireland (the other is in the Botanic Gardens).

Literary references
Then Mount Jerome for the protestants. Funerals all over the world everywhere every minute. Shovelling them under by the cartload doublequick. Thousands every hour. Too many in the world. Ulysses, Chapter 6, Hades episode, James Joyce.

References

External links
 Archiseek page on Mount Jerome Cemetery
 goireland.about.com page describing Mount Jerome Cemetery
 Article by Brian Showers on locating the burial place of the Le Fanu family

Cemeteries in Dublin (city)

Religion in Dublin (city)
Crematoria in the Republic of Ireland